Kwita Izina is a  Rwandan ceremony of giving a name to a newborn baby gorilla. It is named after the ancestral baby naming ceremony that happened after the birth of a newborn.

The ceremony's main goal is in helping monitor each individual gorilla and their groups in their natural habitat.  It was created as a means of bringing attention both locally and internationally about the importance of protecting the mountain gorillas and their habitats in Volcanoes National Park in the Virunga Mountains in the north of the country.

References 
 Rwanda: Kwita Izina Ceremony to Celebrate 18 Baby Gorillas- 16 June 2009
 Africa: Kenya, Uganda Spice Up Kwita Izina- 13 June 2009
 CNN founder Ted Turner treks Mountain Gorillas - 26 May 2009
 Kwita Izina: Rwanda’s 5th Annual Gorilla Naming Ceremony - Jun 25 2009
 "Year of the Gorilla" 5th annual Rwandan Kwita Izina ceremony, to be held on June 20th, 2009
 Rwanda: Kwita Izina Ceremony to Celebrate 18 Baby Gorillas
 Wildlife Direct - Photos From Gorilla Naming Ceremony Jun 23 2008

External links 
 Kwita Izina Events Page  The Rwanda Development Board Kwita Izina Event page

Gorillas
Biosphere reserves of Rwanda
Virunga Mountains
Naming ceremonies